Jeremiah Buck House is located in Bridgeton, Cumberland County, New Jersey, United States. The house was built in 1808 and was added to the National Register of Historic Places on December 30, 1975.

See also
National Register of Historic Places listings in Cumberland County, New Jersey

References

Federal architecture in New Jersey
Houses on the National Register of Historic Places in New Jersey
Houses completed in 1808
Houses in Cumberland County, New Jersey
National Register of Historic Places in Cumberland County, New Jersey
New Jersey Register of Historic Places
Bridgeton, New Jersey